Sogéa FC is a Gabonese football club based in Libreville.

Performance in CAF competitions
CAF Confederation Cup: 1 appearance
2006 – First Round

Current Squad 2011–12
						

Football clubs in Gabon
Football clubs in Libreville